Progress M1-7, identified by NASA as Progress 6P, was a Progress spacecraft used to resupply the International Space Station. It was a Progress-M1 11F615A55 spacecraft, with the serial number 256.

Launch
Progress M1-7 was launched by a Soyuz-FG carrier rocket from Site 1/5 at the Baikonur Cosmodrome. Launch occurred at 18:24:12 UTC on 26 November 2001. The spacecraft docked with the aft port of the Zvezda module at 19:43:02 UTC on 28 November. It was unable to establish a hard dock due to debris from Progress M-45 on the docking port, which had to be removed in an unscheduled extra-vehicular activity on 3 December 2001, after which it was able to establish a hard dock.

Docking
Progress M1-7 remained docked to the ISS for 112 days before undocking at 17:43 UTC on 19 March 2002 to make way for Progress M1-8. It was deorbited at 01:27 UTC on 20 March 2002. The spacecraft burned up in the atmosphere over the Pacific Ocean, with any remaining debris landing in the ocean at around 02:20 UTC.

Progress M1-7 carried supplies to the International Space Station, including food, water and oxygen for the crew and equipment for conducting scientific research. It also carried the Kolibri-2000 (2001-051C) micro-satellite, which it deployed at 22:28 UTC on 19 March 2002, a few hours after departing the ISS.

See also

 List of Progress flights
 Uncrewed spaceflights to the International Space Station

References

Progress (spacecraft) missions
Supply vehicles for the International Space Station
Spacecraft launched in 2001
Spacecraft which reentered in 2002
Spacecraft launched by Soyuz-FG rockets